Peggy Sinclair is an English actress. She was married to the actor Richard Coleman.

Credits

Television

Peggy also appears uncredited as a Children's Panellist in "And Mother Makes Five" in the episode "Double Standards".

Film

References

External links
 

English television actresses
Living people
Year of birth missing (living people)